

History 
The migration of the Mizo people from northeast India to Myanmar from 1914 to 1950 contributed to spreading Presbyterianism within the country. Some of these migrants became Presbyterians during the revival in their region in the 1930s organized by Welsh Presbyterian missionaries. The Presbyterian congregations in Myanmar were under the care of Mizo Presbyterian Church in India for several years until the founding of the Presbyterian Church of Myanmar. Presbyterian Church of Myanmar was found at Losau in 1956. Mizo immigrants formed the Presbyterian Church in Myanmar after they moved to the Kalay and Kabaw Valley in upper Chindwin. They were served first by a Baptist, then by a Methodist minister. The Mizo Presbyterians maintained the Reformed faith. The church spread in the surrounding regions. In 1962 the church was constituted at the national level with 5,000 members. The church extended its activities to the southern Chin Hills, Rakhine State, upper Sagaing Division. The denomination is a member of the World Communion of Reformed Churches and has about 30,000 members in 256 parishes and 160 house fellowships. A partner church relationship with the Presbyterian Church (USA) and Presbyterian Church Ireland have also been established.

Denominations and the Split 
So far the denomination now has 245 congregations with more than 33,000 members. Congregations are spread over a large area of Myanmar, often in remote mountainous regions. Under the umbrellas of Presbyterian also consists several denominations such as Evangelical Presbyterian Denomination, Independent Presbyterian Denomination and Reformed Presbyterian Denomination. The Evangelical Presbyterians emerged in 1983. All members once belonged to diverse denominations, but seceded as these churches, in their eyes, succumbed to liberalism, modernism, and ecumenical and charismatic movements. The church was founded by Rev. Robert Thawm Luai. It has its roots in Chin State. From the Evangelical Presbyterian split the Protestant Reformed Church in Myanmar which holds a conservatives approach on the Christian texts and tradition.

Missions and Doctrines 
Like many other Churches in Myanmar, the missions of Presbyterian Church in Myanmar are focusing on evangelism, social services such as feeding the hungers and providing food to people with socially disadvantage group and social work such building the hospital and well in rural areas along with evangelism. They also focus on church educations and youth and women empowerment in the social sector. The Presbyterian Church of Myanmar and the Methodist Church Upper Myanmar still hold to and stand on the same doctrine to which they have adhered from the beginning. Moreover, they plays a crucial role in responding to natural disasters by donating to those who are affected. Rather, the current leaders desperately need to seek a fresh way of leading the church into a new form of structure and leadership model. The church needs to embrace characteristics of a biblical church first and cultivate it to the larger community outside the church. Presbyterian Church of Myanmar's theology typically emphasizes the sovereignty of God, the authority of the Scriptures, and the necessity of grace through faith in Christ.

Liturgy 
Until a few decades back, almost all Methodist and Presbyterian churches used the Mizo language with the Baptist churches being the exception. All Mizo-Falam-speaking people share a common culture in various aspects. The worship styles takes place in various form such as Sunday gathering in a church as well as house gathering where a smaller cell group of the people meets and pray together. The conception of the Church in Presbyterian Church in Myanmar is that the Church is a place of worship or a gathering place rather an 'institution'. Therefore, in this regard number and the body of the church seems less important that can be a trigger for the split among these denominations  The majority of the Mizo people in Kalay-Kabaw valley are migrants from the Mizoram State, India. They all share the same culture socially and religiously in their worship service. Bible study is also an important aspect of Presbyterian liturgy.

References

Further reading 

 Muana, Lal Thla. 2017. "Missional Leadership: A Case Study of the Representative Congregations of Methodist, Presbyterian, and Other Churches in Tahan-Kalaymyo, Sagaing Region." Order No. 10687142, Asbury Theological Seminary.

Presbyterian denominations in Asia
Members of the World Communion of Reformed Churches
Presbyterian denominations established in the 20th century
Christian organizations established in 1962
Churches in Myanmar